Abbasabad-e Kol Kol (also Romanized as ‘Abbāsābād-e Kol Kol; also known as ‘Abbāsābād-e Gol Gol) is a village in Sanjabi Rural District, Kuzaran District, Kermanshah County, Kermanshah Province, Iran. At the 2006 census, its population was 204, in 33 families.

References 

Populated places in Kermanshah County